Back to Bizznizz is the second album by grime artist Lethal Bizzle. It was released on 23 July 2007.

Track listing

References

2007 albums
V2 Records albums
Albums produced by Mr Hudson
Lethal Bizzle albums